Einabus is a Palestinian village in the northern West Bank, located 12 kilometers (7 miles) south of Nablus and a part of the Nablus Governorate. Nearby towns include Huwara and Beita to the east and Jammain to the south.

Location
It is bordered by Huwwara to the east, ‘Urif to the north, ‘Urif and Jamma'in to the west, and Jamma’in and Huwwara to the south.

Archaeology
Tombs dug out of the rocks and ancient cisterns have been found here.

History
Potsherds from Middle Bronze Age, LB/IA I, Iron Age II, Persian, Hellenistic, Roman and Crusader/Ayyubid era have been found.

The village's old mosque was built during that time and is dedicated to Umar ibn al-Khattab. Until today, olives and figs remain primary sources of income for the residents of Einabus.

The old mosque, Jama al-Arbain, was inspected in 1928 and 1942, and on a column was found inscribed the name Abdallah and the date 625 AH (=1227-1228 CE).

Ottoman era
The village was incorporated into the Ottoman Empire in 1517 with all of Palestine, and in 1596 it appeared in the tax registers as being in the Nahiya of Jabal Qubal, part of the Sanjak of Nablus. It had a population of 49 Muslim households. They paid a fixed tax-rate of 33.3% on agricultural products, including wheat, barley, summer crops, olives, and goats or beehives; a total of 5,317 akçe.

In 1838, Edward Robinson noted it on his travels as a village, named Ain Abus. It was noted was a village in the Jurat Merda district, south of Nablus.

In June, 1870, French explorer Victor Guérin found the village to have a spring (after which it was named), and having about 400 inhabitants. Below the village was a valley of olive trees.

In 1882, the PEF's Survey of Western Palestine described the village (called Ain Abus) as "a small village conspicuous on a low spur of the mountain, with a spring to the west and olives to the south."

British Mandate era
In the 1922 census of Palestine conducted by the British Mandate authorities, 'Ainabus had a population of 227 inhabitants, all Muslims, increasing slightly in the 1931 census to 244, still all Muslim, in a total of 62 houses.

Of this,  were for plantations or irrigated land, 2,107 for cereals, while 29 dunams were built-up (urban) land.

Jordanian era
In the wake of the 1948 Arab–Israeli War, and after the 1949 Armistice Agreements, Einabus came under Jordanian rule.

The Jordanian census of 1961 found 524 inhabitants in Einabus.

Post-1967
Since the Six-Day War in 1967,  Einabus has been under Israeli occupation. 

After the 1995 accords, 85% of the village land was classified as Area B, the remaining 15% as Area C. Israel has confiscated 114 dunums of Ein Abus land for the construction of the Israeli settlement of Yitzhar. Since Yitzhar was established, the villagers of Einabus have been the victims of several violent attacks from the Yitzhar settlers. The Israeli settlers have also stolen crops and damaged Palestinian homes.

As of 2012, Israeli settlers have also taken over land in Area B, in "a combination of unbridled thievery by settlers and impotence on the part of the Israeli authorities."

The village had a population of 1200 in 1987, according to the Palestinian Central Bureau of Statistics, and of 2,340 in 2007.

Infrastructure
There are two girls' secondary schools and one for boys. A charity center founded in 1984 contains a kindergarten and a training center for weaving and helps college-bound students that are financially unable to enter college to attend. In addition to the old mosque, Einabus has two modern mosques.

Government
Einabus is governed by a village council of seven elected members including the chairman or mayor. In 2005, Nafez Rashdan was elected mayor of Einabus.

References

Bibliography

External links
Welcome To 'Aynabus
Einabus, Welcome to Palestine
Survey of Western Palestine, Map 14:   IAA, Wikimedia commons 
  Einabus Village Profile, Applied Research Institute–Jerusalem, ARIJ
 Einabus (aerial photo), ARIJ
 Development Priorities and Needs in ‘Einabus, ARIJ
Aggressions on Palestinians, their Properties and their Lands In 'Einabus village 06-12, 2009, POICA
Continuous Colonists' Aggressions against Palestinian Lands and Belongings in 'Einabus Village 1 April 2010, POICA
 Setting 150 Olive Trees Ablaze in 'Einabus – Nablus city 20, September, 2011, POICA
Colonists of Yizhar Set a Car Ablaze 18, May, 2012, POICA

Villages in the West Bank
Municipalities of the State of Palestine